Brawley may refer to:

Places
Brawley, California, a city in Imperial County, California, United States
Brawley, Missouri, an unincorporated community
Brawley Peaks, a mountain range in Mono County, California
Brawley Seismic Zone, at the south end of the San Andreas Fault

Other uses
Brawley (surname)
Brawley Guitars, a short-lived company that made electric guitars
Brawley Municipal Airport, public airport in Brawley, California, United States
Brawley Union High School, a high school in Brawley, California, United States